ISO 639-5:2008 "Codes for the representation of names of languages—Part 5: Alpha-3 code for language families and groups" is a highly incomplete international standard published by the International Organization for Standardization (ISO).  It was developed by ISO Technical Committee 37, Subcommittee 2, and first published on May 15, 2008.  It is part of the ISO 639 series of standards.

Collective codes

ISO 639-5 defines alpha-3 (3-letter) codes, called "collective codes", that identify language families and groups.
As of the February 11, 2013 update to ISO 639-5, the standard defines 115 collective codes.
The United States Library of Congress maintains the list of Alpha-3 codes that comprise ISO 639-5.

The standard does not cover all language families used by linguists.  The languages covered by a group code need not be linguistically related, but may have a geographic relation, or category relation (such as Creoles).

Relationship to other parts of ISO 639

Some of the codes in ISO 639-5 codes are also found in the ISO 639-2 "Alpha-3 code" standard. ISO 639-2 contains codes for some individual languages, some ISO 639 macrolanguage codes, and some collective codes; any code found in ISO 639-2 is also found in either ISO 639-3 or ISO 639-5.

Languages, families, or group codes in ISO 639-2 can be of type "group" (g) or "remainder group" (r). A "group" consists of several related languages; a "remainder group" is a group of several related languages from which some specific languages have been excluded. However, in ISO 639-5, the "remainder groups" do not exclude any languages. Because ISO 639-2 and ISO 639-5 use the same Alpha-3 codes, but do not always refer to the same list of languages for any given code, the languages an Alpha-3 code refers to can't be determined unless it is known whether the code is used in the context of ISO 639-2 or ISO 639-5.

History
The committee draft of ISO 639-5 was issued on February 23, 2005.  Voting on the draft terminated on July 5, 2005; the draft was approved.

In 2006, the target publication date for the final standard was set at October 30, 2007.  During the approval stage for the standard, the ISO final draft international standard ballot was not initiated until February 8, 2008.  Voting ended on April 10, 2008 ("stage 50.60").

The standard was published on May 15, 2008.

Updates were made in August 2008, February 2009, and February 2013.

Deficiencies
The ISO 639-5 code-set represents a very tiny proportion of the language families and groups of the world.  A more complete attempt at coding was ISO 639-6 (withdrawn in 2014).

References

External links
 
 
 ISO website for purchasing a copy of the ISO 639-5 standard

ISO 639
Language identifiers